Bernardo di Niccolò Machiavelli (between 1426 and 1429 – 1500) was a citizen of Florence and father to Niccolò Machiavelli. Although he was a Doctor of Law (hence, his title of Messer), debts inherited from his father and uncles limiting his career prevented him from joining the legal guild. In the year 1480, Bernardo reported being unemployed on his tax return. He is known independently for his diary or Libro di Ricordi, chronicling the years 1474–1487. The pages, housed in the Biblioteca Riccardiana in Florence, serve as a valuable window into everyday life and culture during the time and provide the only reliable information on his famous son's early youth. Bernardo Machiavelli was married to Bartolommea di Stefano Nelli. They had four children, Primavera, Margherita, Niccolò (the author of The Prince) and Totto.

References

Bibliography
 Catherine Atkinson: Debts, Dowries, Donkeys. The Diary of Niccolò Machiavelli’s Father, Messer Bernardo, in Quattrocento Florence, Frankfurt am Main 2002, 
 Cesare Olschki, Hrsg.: Bernardo Machiavelli, Libro di Ricordi, Florenz 1954.

1420s births
1500 deaths
Italian male writers
Writers from Florence
Niccolò Machiavelli
Italian diarists